Wong Siew Ki (王诗棋; pinyin: Wáng shī qí; born 17 May 1986), is a Malaysian politician who has served as Member of the Selangor State Legislative Assembly (MLA) for Balakong since September 2018. She is a member of the Democratic Action Party (DAP), a component party of the state and federal government Pakatan Harapan (PH) and formerly Pakatan Rakyat (PR) coalitions. She has also served as State Publicity Secretary of DAP of Selangor since November 2021. She previously served as Member of the Subang Jaya Municipal Council (MBSJ), State Youth Chief of DAP Selangor or known as State Chief of the DAP youth wing namely the DAP Socialist Youth (DAPSY) of Selangor, National Assistant Publicity Secretary of DAPSY and Chief of DAPSY of Serdang.

Personal life
Wong was born to Wong Fook Keong and Chin Kooi Seng as their second daughter on 17 May 1986. She grew up in Ipoh, the capital city of Perak, Malaysia.

Education
Wong received her primary, secondary and tertiary educations at Sekolah Jenis Kebangsaan (Cina) Poi Lam Ipoh, Sekolah Menengah Kebangsaan Poi Lam Ipoh, Sekolah Menengah Kebangsaan Methodist (ACS) Ipoh and Universiti Putra Malaysia (UPM). In 2009, she graduated from UPM with a Bachelor of Arts (Foreign Language) major in Chinese Literature. In 2020, she graduated with Master of Arts (Chinese Literature).

Early career
Before becoming a politician, Wong was a blogger writing on politics and current issues. She also made various documentaries. She was also the President of UPM Chinese Society during her university life in 2008. She was actively involved in student movements. After graduating from UPM, she wrote articles about her opinions towards social movements through her blog using her pen name “Tian Fei”. In 2012, she became the director and producer of the documentary about the injustice case of Teoh Beng Hock namely “Zhui Luo/The Fallen” besides working on a full-time basis in the political field, which is quite different compared to other activists and politicians. In 2013, 2014 and 2016, she also directed and produced documentaries namely “Inheritance” (heritage preservation), “Migration” (anti-Lynas movement) and “Instigation” (Sedition Act). In 2013, she and her friends founded Dapur Jalanan Kuala Lumpur in order to help the needy in urban and encourage youngsters to actively involve themselves in social caring activities. Within the same year, in line with the 2013 general election, she commenced her political life by becoming the political secretary to Member of the Selangor State Executive Council (EXCO) and MLA for Seri Kembangan Ean Yong Hian Wah.

Political career

Political Secretary to Selangor EXCO Member and Seri Kembangan MLA as well as Member of the Subang Jaya Municipal Council (2013–2016)
In 2013, Yong invited Wong to serve as his political secretary. She was appointed and sworn in as the MBSJ Member in 2016. During her term in the position, she actively promoted recycling activities.

Member of the Democratic Action Party (2014–present)
Wong joined DAP during her term as MBSJ Member in 2014. She was elected as the Balakong MLA during her term as Serdang DAPSY Chief on 8 September 2018. In November 2018, she led a team comprising her fellow Bandar Utama MLA Jamaliah Jamaluddin to contest in the Selangor DAPSY election, the team was elected to the Selangor DAPSY state committee and she was appointed as the State Youth Chief of DAP Selangor or known as the Selangor State DAPSY Chief. On 14 November 2021, she contested in the Selangor DAP election, she gained 562 votes from the delegates and was ranked the 9th highest among the candidates. Therefore, she was elected to the Selangor DAP state committee as one of the 15 candidates with most votes. After being elected, she was appointed as the Publicity Secretary in the new committee line-up.

Member of the Selangor State Legislative Assembly for Balakong (2018–present)

2018 Balakong by-election
The Balakong by-election was held on 8 September 2018 for the Selangor State Legislative Assembly state seat of Balakong after only 4 months of the Selangor state election. The seat became vacant after the death of the incumbent MLA Eddie Ng Tien Chee in a car accident on the Cheras–Kajang Expressway on 20 July 2018. Ng was a member of DAP, a component party of the PH coalition. This was the second casual vacancy in the assembly since the 2018 general election after the one of the Sungai Kandis state seat. The Sungai Kandis by-election was held to elect its new MLA on 3 August 2018. The Balakong by-election was also held alongside the Seri Setia by-election on the same day. In the last election, Ng from PH and DAP defeated fellow candidates Lim Chin Wah of both the Barisan Nasional (BN) and Malaysian Chinese Association (MCA) as well as Mohamad Ibrahim Ghazali of the Malaysian Islamic Party (PAS) by the majority of 35,538 votes. The by-election saw a straight fight between PH and BN as PAS had decided against contesting to make way for the BN candidate Tan Chee Teong to avoid splitting the share of votes, similar to what had been done for the Sungai Kandis by-election a month earlier. On 14 August 2018, DAP declared Wong as the candidate in the election and on the nomination day of 18 August 2018, she was nominated as the candidate representing PH and DAP in the election. Candidates contesting in the by-election were given 21 days to campaign. On 8 September 2018 of the polling day, Wong gained 22,508 votes. Meanwhile, Tan gained 3,975 votes and managed to retain his deposit by obtaining at least 1/8 of the total number of votes. Hence, Wong defeated Tan by the majority of 18,533 votes. In terms of postal votes, out of 40 votes, PH garnered 12 votes and MCA garnered 4 votes. The remaining 24 votes were not brought back. Besides, 25 police and army personnel voted for PH while 2 voted for MCA. Results of the by-election meant that Wong successfully retained the seat with a larger share of votes in the election compared to the share in the last election. Nevertheless, the voter turnout rate was lower compared to the 2018 general election and Sungai Kandis by-election, which was only 42.97%.

Election results

 PH kekal di Seri Setia dan Balakong
 Unofficial: PH retains Balakong state seat

Books published

 从〈午夜香吻〉到〈麻坡的华语〉：大马华语流行歌曲中的身份建构

Documentaries and articles

 Jatuh / 坠落（2012）：Dokumentari berkenaan Kes Kematian Teoh Beng Hock 赵明福冤案纪录片https://www.youtube.com/watch?v=2Yq4rLg9TWo&t=812s 
 Warisan / 传承（2014）：Dokumentari berkenaan bangunan warisan 古迹保存纪录片 https://www.youtube.com/watch?v=H2zfXD9dHQc
 Hijrah / 迁移（2014）：Dokumentari berkenaan Usaha Anti-Lynas 反莱纳斯工厂活动纪录片 https://www.youtube.com/watch?v=t92H60YAECI  
 Hasut / 煽动（2016）：Dokumentari Berkenaan Akta Hasutan 煽动法令纪录片 https://www.youtube.com/watch?v=TUeCZaHxjZs

News

 Sungai Chua homeowners want compensation from project contractor
 Kajang folk say Saturday's flood the 'worst in five years'
 Husband of snatch theft victim who's in ICU: Help us find the perpetrator
 Kajang, Hulu Langat dilanda banjir kilat
 Kena ‘troll’ Super Ring, Najib suruh jaga diet
 ‘Do not buy into fake news on aid for seniors’
 Pakatan's Balakong by-election candidate Wong Siew Ki vows to tackle water woes
 House buyers ‘left in lurch’ by govt-backed project

References

Democratic Action Party (Malaysia) politicians
Living people
1986 births